Year 158 (CLVIII) was a common year starting on Saturday (link will display the full calendar) of the Julian calendar. At the time, it was known as the Year of the Consulship of Tertullus and Sacerdos (or, less frequently, year 911 Ab urbe condita). The denomination 158 for this year has been used since the early medieval period, when the Anno Domini calendar era became the prevalent method in Europe for naming years.

Events 
 By place 
 Roman Empire 
 The earliest dated use of Sol Invictus, in a dedication from Rome.
 A revolt against Roman rule in Dacia is crushed.
 China 
 Change of era name from Yongshou to Yangxi of the Chinese Han Dynasty.

Births 
Gaius Caesonius Macer Rufinianus, Roman politician (d. 237)

Deaths 
 Wang Yi, Chinese librarian and poet (d. AD 89)

References